The Greek destroyer (τορπιλλοβόλον) Doxa ("glory"), served in the Royal Hellenic Navy from 1907–1917. She was one of four s ordered from Germany in 1905 and was built in the Vulcan shipyard at Stettin.

She saw action in the First Balkan War in 1912–13 under Alexandros Chatzikyriakos. During World War I, Greece did not enter the war on the side of the Triple Entente until 1917 and, due to Greece's neutrality the four Niki-class ships had been seized by the Allies in October 1916, taken over by the French in November and served in the French Navy until 1917.

See also
History of the Hellenic Navy

References

Niki-class destroyers
1906 ships
Ships sunk by German submarines in World War I
Maritime incidents in 1917
Shipwrecks of Italy
Straits of Messina
Ships built in Stettin
World War I destroyers of Greece
World War I destroyers of France
World War I shipwrecks in the Mediterranean Sea
Military units and formations of Greece in the Balkan Wars